American Dream (stylized in all-lowercase on digital releases) is the fourth studio album by American rock band LCD Soundsystem, released on September 1, 2017, by DFA and Columbia. It was announced on January 5, 2016, the day after it was revealed that the band was reuniting after a disbandment lasting nearly five years. It is the band's first album in seven years, following This Is Happening (2010).  This album reached number 1 on the Top Rock Albums chart and was LCD Soundsystem's first record to top the US Billboard 200.

Prior to release, LCD Soundsystem performed at large music festivals as well as smaller shows to promote their reunion. "Call the Police" and "American Dream" were released together as the album's lead single on May 5, 2017, and "Tonite" was released as the second single on August 16, 2017. "Oh Baby" was later released as a single on September 20, 2018. The album received widespread acclaim from music critics, appeared on many year-end lists, and was named "Album of the Year" by Mojo and Uncut. The album performed well commercially and became the band's first number-one album in the United States, Canada, and Portugal. At the 60th Annual Grammy Awards, the album was nominated for Best Alternative Music Album and "Tonite" won the Grammy Award for Best Dance Recording.

Background
LCD Soundsystem's third and previous studio album, This Is Happening, was released in 2010. After the album's release, the band announced their breakup in early 2011 and also announced that they would end with a show at Madison Square Garden on April 2, 2011. Due to the raising of ticket prices by scalpers, the band made plans to perform warm-up shows at Terminal 5 in Manhattan, New York. After their final show, they released a documentary film in 2012, which followed the band prior to the show and featured footage of the actual performance. The album The Long Goodbye: LCD Soundsystem Live at Madison Square Garden, which contained the audio from the show, was released in 2014 as a Record Store Day release.

In October 2015, online publication Consequence of Sound reported that "multiple sources" could confirm that LCD Soundsystem would be reuniting in 2016 and that they would be headlining "high-profile music festivals in the US and UK." This report was later confirmed by Billboard. However, DFA Records label manager Kris Petersen stated that LCD Soundsystem would not be reuniting. DFA co-founder Jonathan Galkin also confirmed this in a Pitchfork article. Two months afterward, the band released the Christmas-themed track "Christmas Will Break Your Heart", acting as their first piece of new material since their cover of Franz Ferdinand's "Live Alone", released in 2011. Consequence of Sound and Pitchfork both reported again, after the release of the Christmas single, that multiple sources could confirm a reunion in 2016.

On January 4, 2016, it was announced that LCD Soundsystem would be headlining the 2016 Coachella Festival. The following day, the band announced that they would be releasing a new album some time in 2016, although they were not yet entirely finished with the album. It was later revealed that the band signed with Columbia Records. Following a backlash by some online users against the reunion, Murphy explained his reasoning for the reunion in a post on the band's website. He stated that he did not want to release a solo album with live performances including LCD Soundsystem members, nor did he want to release an LCD Soundsystem album with entirely different people playing live, that is, if the original members did not want to create a new record. He had invited past members Nancy Whang and Pat Mahoney to his apartment to talk about releasing new material, where they both agreed on making a new LCD Soundsystem record together.

Recording
The band recorded the album in multiple locations. Like previous albums Sound of Silver and This Is Happening, one of the recording locations was DFA Studios in New York City. Murphy announced after finishing recording that American Dream would be the last record to be recorded at the original DFA Studios building. Recording also took place at the Lanark, Strongroom, and Church studios in London and B-Side Studios in Portland, Oregon. The band were forced to cancel tour dates for shows in Asia and Australia dated during the near-end of 2016 in order to complete work on the album. After this was revealed, it was suggested that the release date for the album would be moved into 2017, as opposed to the original prediction of 2016, as the recording was predicted to take another few months. It was noted in April 2017 that the band had been working on the album for 18 months. In a Facebook post released in May, Murphy announced that the album was finished and that it was prepped for mastering.

Composition
Musically, American Dream has been described as dance-punk, new wave, post-punk, synth-pop, art rock and dance-rock. Critics noted the album as similar to David Bowie's Berlin Trilogy. The album's lyrics deal with depression, social issues, fear, and ending of friendship and love.

The album's closing track, "Black Screen" is an homage to Bowie. Murphy wanted to get Canadian singer-songwriter Leonard Cohen to perform a spoken word piece at the end of the track, but Cohen died only a few days after he came up with the idea.

Packaging
The cover art for American Dream was revealed on August 4, 2017. The artwork, which has been labeled as "straightforward" and having a "simple aesthetic", is a painting titled UP done by Murphy's friend Robert Reynolds. It consists of a blue sky with a few clouds and a white-hot sun in the middle. The band's name and the album title are aligned on top of the painting. It has also been labeled as the band's most colorful artwork to date. People thought of the artwork as a possible homage to the front cover of the 1996 David Foster Wallace novel Infinite Jest, a book with which James Murphy was known to have long been familiar. Reynolds, however, dismissed any intentional similarity to the novel in an interview. After the artwork was revealed, it attracted criticism from users on Twitter. One user jokingly stated that they considered cancelling their vinyl pre-order of the album due to their dislike of the cover art. Other users compared it, quality-wise, to a preset for a slide on Microsoft PowerPoint as well as the cover art for Kasabian's 2017 album For Crying Out Loud. Billboards Tatiana Cirisano listed the album cover as one of the worst of 2017, stating that it "looks like it could have been concocted using a stock photo and some toying with Microsoft Word".

The vinyl release of the album features a gatefold containing two vinyl records, both weighing 140 grams each. A code that grants the buyer with a digital download of the album was also included with the purchase of the vinyl release. The gatefold jacket and inner sleeves are both done in full color. The cassette release includes custom silk-screened cases and shells. The case contains a five-sided insert that is also done in full color and the cassette shell is clear-colored.

Promotion and release

LCD Soundsystem released "Call the Police" and "American Dream" together as a digital double-A-side single on May 5, 2017, acting as the lead single from the album. The two songs were made available for listening once midnight was reached in one's time zone. The band promoted the songs by performing both during the May 6 episode of the 42nd season of Saturday Night Live. On August 4, the band rolled out an ice cream truck outside of the Lollapalooza festival in Chicago promoting the album. The truck played songs from the album in the form of ice cream jingles through its speaker. A Twitter account for the truck was also launched to provide updates on where its current location was. On August 16, "Tonite" was premiered on Zane Lowe's radio show on Beats 1. Along with the premiere was the release of a music video for the track, directed by Joel Kefali. It was also subsequently made available for streaming on Spotify. A virtual reality experience made to accompany the song, titled "Dance Tonite", was released to the public on August 22, though first previewed privately in June. Available to use in an Internet browser, the experience allowed people with room scale virtual reality kits, such as the Oculus Rift, to dance along to the track. Those with more simpler VR headsets, like the Daydream View, could view the experience as well the dance performances done by others. The band teamed up with the Puckney and Moniker design studios from Amsterdam for the project, alongside Google's data arts team. On August 31, the band released a 14-minute instrumental track called "Pulse (v.1)" as a free download. On Facebook, Murphy wrote that the track was "not precisely part of the record," but instead thought of it as an "addendum" meant to be played after the album's closing track, "Black Screen". It was originally left off of American Dream due to it not being able to fit on the vinyl format of the album. A music video for "Oh Baby", directed by Rian Johnson, was released on September 20, 2018. The video depicts an elderly couple, portrayed by Sissy Spacek and David Strathairn, who build a teleporter in their garage.

The album's title and track listing were both revealed on June 19, 2017. American Dream was released on September 1, 2017 through DFA Records and Columbia Records. The band started accepting pre-orders of the album on August 4. A limited edition cassette release of the album was made available on the band's official Bandcamp page. Different options were given for the vinyl release besides a standard edition; there were also options given to buy a bundle of the vinyl plus either a tote bag, a poster, or postcard photos autographed by the band. European digital retailer Qobuz made the album available for download and streaming in a lossless format. The Japanese CD release of the album contains "Pulse (v.1)" as a bonus track, placed at the very end of the album. American Dream received a digital re-release on October 6, which also included "Pulse (v.1)" as a bonus track.

Tour

Along with the initial announcement of a new album, LCD Soundsystem indicated an expanded tour that went on throughout 2016, including both smaller shows and appearances at festivals that they headlined. The first show of their tour took place on March 27 at Webster Hall in East Village, Manhattan. This marked their first show in almost five years (following their farewell show). It had a ticket distribution system in the form of a lottery. Festivals that they headlined in 2016 include the Coachella, Lollapalooza, Outside Lands, Bonnaroo, and Austin City Limits festivals in the US, as well as being on top bill at Primavera in Barcelona in June. They also headlined the Other Stage, the second stage at Glastonbury Festival in the UK, in June 2016. In September, the band headlined the Sunday show of LouFest in St. Louis. The band was scheduled to perform at the III Points Festival during October in Miami, Florida, but were forced to cancel their set due to weather complications caused by Hurricane Matthew.

The band's first live appearance of 2017 took place at the then-recently opened Brooklyn Steel venue in New York City. It was during their five-night residency at the venue where they performed album tracks "Tonite", "Call the Police", "American Dream", and "Emotional Haircut" live for the first time. The band had also made a plea to those in attendance to not record these performances so the songs can be formally released by the band themselves. They later performed a set at a Google I/O conference on 18 May. It was here where the Dance Tonite VR experience was initially previewed. On June 19, the band announced dates for a world tour, spanning from June to December 2017. The band also performed second and third stints at Brooklyn Steel during the tour, totaling to 22 sold out dates at the venue in 2017 and almost 40,000 tickets sold. In early 2018, the band was set for a return to New Zealand and Australia only 7 months after a brief tour of the latter, but all shows were cancelled due to "unforeseen circumstances".

Leg 1 (Back from the Dead Tour)

Leg 2 (American Dream Tour)

Reception

Critical

American Dream received critical acclaim from contemporary music critics. On review aggregator Metacritic, it received an average score of 86 out of 100, based on 37 reviews, indicating "universal acclaim". At the online review aggregator AnyDecentMusic?, the album received a score of 8.2 out of a possible score of 10 based on the aggregate score taken from 36 reviews.

Leah Greenblatt of Entertainment Weekly wrote that the album "feels like exactly the album 2017 needs—urgent, angry, achingly self-aware." Ryan Dombal of Pitchfork marked the album as "Best New Music", said "The rebirth of LCD Soundsystem is marked by an extraordinary album obsessed with endings: of friendships, of love, of heroes, of a certain type of geeky fandom, and of the American dream itself", and gave it a 8.5/10.

Jordan Bassett of NME wrote: "The band retains the uncanny power to encapsulate a place and time. This is a cautious return, not a triumphant one – and that proves LCD Soundsystem are very 2017", awarding it 5 out of 5 stars. Rachel Aroesti of The Guardian also gave it 5 out of 5 stars, saying: "Packed with aural allusions to Bowie and Brian Eno, LCD Soundsystem's comeback is a virtuosic tribute to their heroes – and themselves." Sean O'Neal of The A.V. Club wrote: "As far as American Dream being better than that estimable trilogy that preceded it, well, it depends mightily on how you define "better." It's a beautifully produced, masterfully realized album, but it's also a bit of a downer and an unusually slow burn" and gave it an A−.

Victoria Segal of Mojo gave it four stars, claiming "American Dream feels like a strong re-statement of what they do, and what they can mean, a record that, despite its fear of death, feels very much alive." In a review for Rolling Stone, Rob Sheffield stated "James Murphy and his wrecking crew of New York punk-disco marauders don't waste a moment on the superb American Dream – it's a relentless, expansive, maddeningly funny set of songs asking how a lifetime of good intentions and hard work can blow up into such a mess."

However, Andy Gill of The Independent wrote that many tracks "suffer from a shortfall of melodic potency, and a lack of lateral development, especially in longer pieces", and that "often, the journey just isn't worth the destination". Joseph Stannard of The Wire was scathing about "the inexpressive lite-white stadium bluster of the tracks – frequently recalling U2 at their bloated worst [...] This record is no cause for celebration. It's a slab of nothing, a media spectacle for the terminally impressed."

Commercial
American Dream had a positive commercial performance during its first week of release. The album sold 85,000 equivalent album units, 81,000 being traditional album sales, in the United States. This led to the band's first number-one album on the Billboard 200 chart and their second in the top ten, following This Is Happening (2010). A promotion involving concert tickets that gave out copies of the album with a ticket purchase helped increase sales numbers. It also became the band's first number-one album in Canada and Portugal. The album also debuted at number 3 in Ireland, Scotland, and the United Kingdom. It also entered the top ten in Australia and New Zealand and the top twenty in both of the Belgian albums charts, France, the Netherlands, and Spain.

Accolades
In addition to receiving positive reviews from critics, the album was placed on numerous year-end album lists. It reached the top-ten in several lists, while also appearing at number one on Mojos and Uncuts lists. At the 60th Annual Grammy Awards, the album was nominated for Best Alternative Music Album and the song "Tonite" was nominated for Best Dance Recording. The album lost to Sleep Well Beast by the National, while "Tonite" won in its category. This marked the first Grammy win for the band, after being nominated five different times previously without winning.

Track listing
On digital releases, the album title and track names are stylized as lowercase letters; e.g., "Call the Police" is "call the police".

Personnel
All personnel and credits adapted from album liner notes.

LCD Soundsystem
 James Murphy – vocals , Gretsch drums , EMS Synthi AKS , bass guitar , guitar , percussion , Roland SH-101 , Synare , Korg MS-20 , ARP Odyssey , piano , Roland Jupiter-4 , ARP Omni II , Roland TR-33 , snaps , Oberheim SEM , Roland TR-808 , Yamaha CS-60 , DFA custom modular synth , Roland System-100M , Crumar Performer , Moog CDX organ , Yamaha organ , Korg SQ-10 , chop guitar , Maplin MatrixSynth , bongos , Simmons SDS-V , synth bass , Roland SH-5 , Korg Trident II , Moog Voyager , glockenspiel , tongue drum , Korg MS-50 , Powertran Polysynth , Fuku-Masu Seq & BSC 
 Pat Mahoney – drums , vocals 
 Nancy Whang – vocals 
 Tyler Pope – bass guitar 
 Al Doyle – piano , Korg PS-3100 , guitar , vocals , Yamaha CS01 , snake guitar , cello , bowed mandolin , congas , Synare , vocoder controller , Roland SH-5 , Korg Delta , Oberheim OB-3 , 
 Gavilán Rayna Russom – arpeggiated Roland Jupiter-4 , Korg MS-20 , Oberheim SEM , vocals 
 Matt Thornley
 Korey Richey – vocals , snaps 

Additional musicians
 Matt Shaw – Yamaha CS-60 
 Riley MacIntyre – snaps 

Production
 James Murphy – production, mixing 
 Dave Sardy – mixing 
 Bob Weston – mastering
 Korey Richey – mastering assistance, engineering
 Matt Shaw – engineering assistance
 Al Doyle – engineering assistance
 Riley MacIntyre – engineering assistance
 David Jones – engineering assistance
 Raymond Richards – B-side engineering 
 Cameron Barton – mix assistance

Artwork
 Michael Vadino – art direction, gatefold photos
 Robert Reynolds – original painting UP, 2017
 Jeff McLane – photo of UP
 James Murphy – gatefold photos
 Brian Graf – gatefold photos
 Korey Richey – additional photos

Charts

Weekly charts

Year-end charts

Release history

Notes and references
Notes

References

External links

2017 albums
Albums produced by James Murphy (electronic musician)
Art rock albums by American artists
Columbia Records albums
DFA Records albums
LCD Soundsystem albums
New wave albums by American artists
Albums recorded at The Church Studios